Gordon Richards (27 October 1893 – 13 January 1964) was an English actor who had an active international career on the stage and in television and film for more than 50 years. 

He began his career performing in theatres in London's West End in 1909, and made his Broadway debut in 1913. He appeared in numerous plays and musicals on Broadway through 1951. Active as a performer in both television and film, he appeared in 35 Hollywood films during his career.

Life and career
Born in Gillingham, Kent, England, Richards was trained at the Royal Academy of Dramatic Art in London where his fellow classmate was Roland Young. He  began acting professionally on the London stage at the age of 16 in 1909. He became a member of Sir Johnston Forbes-Robertson's theater company; a group with which he toured to the United States in 1913-1914. He made his Broadway debut with that company on October 20, 1913 at the Shubert Theatre as the Nubian Sentinel in George Bernard Shaw's Caesar and Cleopatra. With that group he also portrayed the First Messenger in William Shakespeare's Othello at the Schubert Theatre in 1914.

Richards served in the British Army during World War I. He made several more appearance on Broadway upon his return to the United States in 1927, including Frederick Witney's The Adventurous Age (1927), Cosmo Hamilton's Caste (1927), Robert Nichols's Wings Over Europe (1928), Kenyon Scott's A Noble Rogue (1929), Martha Stanley's Let and Sub-Let (1930), Michael Grismaijer's The Noble Experiment (1930), Howard Warren Comstock's Doctor X (1931), John Larkin's Society Girl (1931-1932), Thetta Quay Franks's Money In The Air (1932), A. J. Minor's Masks and Faces (1933), Hardwick Nevin's Whatever Possessed Her (1934), Arthur Schwartz's Virginia (1937), Ernest Pascal's I Am Youth (1938), Leslie and Sewell Stokes's Oscar Wilde (1938-1939), Cole Porter's Something for the Boys (1943-1944), Gottfried Reinhardt's Helen Goes To Troy (1944), and Philip Barry's Second Threshold (1951). He also starred in National tours of The Great Waltz and Springtime for Henry.

From 1942-1956 Richards appeared in 35 Hollywood films in mainly small to mid sized character roles. Some of his more substantial appearances included the painter Joshua Reynolds in Kitty (1945), Sir Harry Bragdon in White Pongo (1945),  Tom Walker in Flight to Nowhere (1946), Burton Stallings in Larceny in Her Heart (1946), Sam Thompson in Linda, Be Good (1947), Police Inspector McIver in 13 Lead Soldiers (1948), Col. Von Meyer in Women in the Night (1948), and Clayton in Song of Surrender (1949). On American television he portrayed Hubert Twombly in The Adventures of Rin Tin Tin in the 1950s.

He died in Los Angeles at the age of 70 in 1964.

Selected filmography

The Wife Takes a Flyer (1942) - Maj. Wilson (uncredited)
Slightly Dangerous (1943) - Garrett - Butler (uncredited)
The Story of Dr. Wassell (1944) - Naval Officer (uncredited)
The Canterville Ghost (1944) - Nobleman (uncredited)
Frenchman's Creek (1944) - Guest (uncredited) 
Mrs. Parkington (1944) - James (uncredited)
National Velvet (1944) - Doctor (uncredited)
The Affairs of Susan (1945) - Mr. Giddon (uncredited)
Molly and Me (1945) - Jamie McDougall (uncredited)
Week-End at the Waldorf (1945) - Headwaiter (uncredited)
White Pongo (1945) - Sir Harry Bragdon
Kitty (1945) - Sir Joshua Reynolds
Confidential Agent (1945) - Immigration Officer (uncredited)
Naughty Nanette (1946, Short) - Papa Belleau
Larceny in Her Heart (1946) - Burton Stallings
Night and Day (1946) - Cochran (uncredited)
Flight to Nowhere (1946) - Tom Walker
Undercurrent (1946) - Headwaiter (uncredited)
The Imperfect Lady (1946) - Gladstone
Ladies' Man (1947) - Mr. Bolton, Sponsor (uncredited)
The Hucksters (1947) - Conrad (uncredited)
Golden Earrings (1947) - Club Member with Denistoun (uncredited)
Unconquered (1947) - Sheriff (uncredited)
Merton of the Movies (1947) - Kristen - Beulah's Butler (uncredited)
Linda, Be Good (1947) - Sam Thompson
Cass Timberlane (1947) - Butler (uncredited)
Women in the Night (1948) - Colonel Von Meyer
The Big Clock (1948) - Warren Parks (uncredited)
13 Lead Soldiers (1948) - Police Insp. McIver
A Connecticut Yankee in King Arthur's Court (1948) - Tour Guide (uncredited)
The Secret of St. Ives (1949) - Prosecution Officer (uncredited)
Song of Surrender (1949) - Clayton - Butler (uncredited)
Challenge to Lassie (1949) - Constable (uncredited)
Port of New York (1949) - Florentine's Purser (uncredited)
Samson and Delilah (1949) - Guide (uncredited)
The Big Hangover (1950) - Williams, the Chauffeur
Kiss Tomorrow Goodbye (1950) - Butler (uncredited)
The Man Who Cheated Himself (1950) - Albert: the Butler
Washington Story (1952) - Butler (uncredited)
The Prisoner of Zenda (1952) - Dignitary (uncredited)
Million Dollar Mermaid (1952) - Casey (uncredited)
Titanic (1953) - Mr. Webster - Manager of Clothing Shop (uncredited)
Dream Wife (1953) - Sir Cecil (uncredited)
Latin Lovers (1953) - George - Paul's Butler (uncredited)
Rhapsody (1954) - English Butler (uncredited)
Rose Marie (1954) - Attorney (uncredited)
The Rainbow Jacket (1954) - Jockey (uncredited)
The Student Prince (1954) - Major Domo (uncredited)
The Prodigal (1955) - Nahreeb's Scribe (uncredited)
Cavalcade of America (1955, Episode: "The Rescue of Dr. Beanes") - (uncredited)
Moonfleet (1955) - Marling (uncredtied)
The Scarlet Coat (1955) - Mr. Cameron (uncredited)
The King's Thief (1955) - Courier (uncredited)
The Tender Trap (1955) - Doorman (uncredited)
Gaby (1956) - Air Raid Warden (uncredited)
High Society (1956) - Dexter-Haven's Butler
Lust for Life (1956) - Customer (uncredited)
The Best Things in Life Are Free (1956) - Butler (uncredited)
The Opposite Sex (1956) - Hilliards' Butler (uncredited)

References

External links

 
 Gordon Richards at ibdb

1893 births
1964 deaths
English actors
Alumni of RADA
People from Gillingham, Kent
British emigrants to the United States